Safari Express is a 1976 Italian-German adventure-comedy film directed by Duccio Tessari. It is the sequel of Africa Express.

Cast 

 Ursula Andress: Miriam 
 Giuliano Gemma: John Baxter 
 Jack Palance: Van Daalen 
 Peter Martell: Howard Spring
 Giuseppe Maffioli: Father Gasperin
 Lorella De Luca: The American Tourist

See also 
 
 List of Italian films of 1976

References

External links

1976 films
Italian comedy films
1970s adventure comedy films
1970s Italian-language films
Films directed by Duccio Tessari
Films scored by Guido & Maurizio De Angelis
Italian sequel films
1976 comedy films
1970s Italian films